Kevin Hundelt is a retired American soccer player who spent his entire professional career playing in indoor leagues.  These include the first Major Indoor Soccer League and second Major Indoor Soccer League, National Professional Soccer League and Continental Indoor Soccer League.  He was the 1999 NPSL Defender of the Year and also earned one cap with the United States U-20 men's national soccer team in 1987.

Player

Youth
Hundelt graduated from St. Thomas Aquinas-Mercy High School where he led school's soccer team to the 1985 Missouri State High School Soccer Championship.  Hundelt was the 1985 Gatorade National High School Player of the Year.  He then attended Southern Illinois University Edwardsville where he played one year on the men's soccer team.

Professional
In fall of 1987, Hundelt turned professional with the St. Louis Steamers of the Major Indoor Soccer League.  He spent the first half of the season on the reserve squad, but gained his first game in January 1988.  After that, he became a regular with the first team.  When the Steamers folded at the end of the season, Hundelt signed with the Kansas City Comets.  After playing three seasons with the Comets, Hundelt signed as a free agent with the St. Louis Storm in July 1991.  When both the Storm and the league collapsed at the end of the season. Hundelt moved to the St. Louis Ambush of the National Professional Soccer League where he spent seven seasons.  He was the 1999 NPSL Defender of the Year.  He gained the award by becoming the first player in league history to finish in the top five in both blocked shots and assists in one season.  In 1994, Hundelt spent the summer indoor season with the San Jose Grizzlies of the Continental Indoor Soccer League.  After his standout 1998–1999 season, the Ambush both passed on Hundelt as the team's new coach and asked him to take a pay cut.  He therefore decided to seek another team.

  On October 6, 1999, he signed with the St. Louis Steamers of the World Indoor Soccer League.  On July 30, 2003, the KiXX traded Hundelt, along with Mark Moser, Droo Callahan and Matt DeJong to the Steamers in exchange for Cesidio Colasante and Joe Santana.  There is no indication that he played for either the KiXX or the Steamers.

National team
In 1987, Hundelt played at least one game with the U-20 team in a 1–0 loss to Chile.

Coach
In the fall of 1998, the St. Louis Ambush named Hundelt as a player-assistant coach. In the summer of 1999, the Ambush began looking for a new head coach. After initially saying that Hundelt would most likely be selected for the position, the team ownership went with Jamie Swanner.

Yearly awards
 NPSL Defender of the Year (1999)
 NPSL All-Star Team (1999)

References

External links
St. Louis Steamers players
MISL stats

1967 births
Living people
American soccer players
American soccer coaches
Continental Indoor Soccer League players
Kansas City Comets (original MISL) players
Major Indoor Soccer League (1978–1992) players
Major Indoor Soccer League (2001–2008) players
National Professional Soccer League (1984–2001) coaches
National Professional Soccer League (1984–2001) players
Parade High School All-Americans (boys' soccer)
SIU Edwardsville Cougars men's soccer players
Soccer players from St. Louis
St. Louis Storm players
St. Louis Ambush (1992–2000) players
St. Louis Steamers (original MISL) players
St. Louis Steamers (WISL) players
San Jose Grizzlies players
United States men's under-20 international soccer players
World Indoor Soccer League players
Association football defenders
Association football midfielders